Brendan Quinn (born 26 July 1960) is an Irish middle-distance runner. He competed in the men's 3000 metres steeplechase at the 1988 Summer Olympics.

References

External links
 

1960 births
Living people
Athletes (track and field) at the 1988 Summer Olympics
Irish male middle-distance runners
Irish male steeplechase runners
Olympic athletes of Ireland
Place of birth missing (living people)